The Legend of the 7 Golden Vampires is a 1974 martial arts horror film. The film opens in 1804, when seven vampires clad in gold masks are resurrected by Count Dracula, played by John Forbes-Robertson. A century later, Peter Cushing as Professor Van Helsing, known in the world for his exploits with Dracula, 
is recruited by a man and his seven siblings after giving a lecture at a Chinese university to take on the vampires. The film is a British-Hong Kong co-production between Hammer Film Productions and Shaw Brothers Studio.

The film was shot between October 22 and December 11, 1973, at Shaw Brothers Studios in Hong Kong, where Chang Cheh was hired to direct further martial arts scenes for the film's release in the East. The film was first released in Hong Kong and then in the United Kingdom with a shorter runtime. On its release in the United States, the film was truncated further and titled The 7 Brothers Meet Dracula. The film was a financial failure.

Baker said it was a "Terrible picture, but some of the Chinese were very
nice the leading man was David Chang, a nice man. The kung-fu people were alright. They went a bit berserk but I left that alone. The understanding was that they would do the kung-fu stuff and I would do the rest of it, which suited me no end I can tell you."

Plot
In Transylvania in 1804, a lone figure makes his way through the countryside and into the towering Castle Dracula, where he summons Count Dracula. The figure announces, in his own language, that his name is Kah, a Taoist monk and the high priest of the Temple of the Seven Golden Vampires in rural China. He goes on to tell the Count that the Seven Golden Vampires' power is fading and he needs him to restore them to their former glory. Dracula considers the offer and accepts on one condition: that he uses Kah's body to escape his castle, which has become his prison. Despite Kah's pleas for mercy, the vampire displaces himself into Kah's body and then triumphantly leaves the tomb for China.

A century later, Professor Van Helsing gives a lecture at a Chungking university on Chinese vampire legends. He speaks of an unknown rural village that has been terrorised by a cult of seven known as the Seven Golden Vampires. A farmer who had lost his wife to the vampires trekked his way to their temple and battled them. He was unsuccessful, as his wife was killed in the fight, but in the chaos he grabbed a medallion from around one of the vampire's necks, which he saw as the vampires' life source. The farmer fled the temple, but the high priest sent the vampires and their turned victims after him. About to be cornered, the farmer placed the medallion around a small jade Buddha statue before the vampires killed him. One of the vampires spied the medallion around the Buddha and went over to collect it. However, the moment that the vampire touched the Buddha, the creature was destroyed in flames.

Van Helsing goes on to say that he is positive that the village still exists and is terrorized by the six remaining vampires; he is only unsure of where the village lies. Most of the professors he has gathered disbelieve the story and leave, but one man, Hsi Ching, informs Van Helsing that the farmer from the story was his grandfather. He proves it by producing the dead vampire's medallion and asks Van Helsing if he would be willing to travel to the village and destroy the vampire menace. Van Helsing agrees and embarks with his son Leyland, Hsi Ching, and his seven kung fu-trained siblings on a dangerous journey, funded by a wealthy widow named Vanessa Buren, whom Leyland and two of Ching's siblings saved from an attack by the tongs.

On the journey, the group are ambushed by the six remaining vampires in a cave, along with their army of undead. The group are quickly engaged in battle and soon kill the three vampires. The remaining three retreat, taking their army of undead with them. The following morning, the party reaches the village, partly ruined but still populated, and prepares to make their final stand. They use wooden stakes as barriers and dig a large trench around them filled with flammable liquid. In the temple that evening, Dracula, still disguised as Kah, calls on the remaining vampires to kill Van Helsing and his party once and for all. The vampires reach the village, and soon Van Helsing's group once again do battle with the last of the golden vampires and their army of undead, resulting in a brutal fight that kills two vampires, many undead servants, several villagers, and several of Van Helsing's companions. During the fight, Vanessa is bitten by one of the vampires and quickly becomes one herself. She bites Ching, who throws himself and Vanessa onto a wooden stake, impaling them both.

Elsewhere, the last remaining vampire captures Ching's sister Mai Kwei and takes her back to the temple in order to be drained of her blood. Leyland steals a horse from one of the dead vampires and pursues. The army of undead defeated, Van Helsing and Mei's remaining brothers follow to help Leyland at the temple. Having reached the temple, the vampire straps Mai Kwei to one of the altars. It is about to drain her blood when Leyland intervenes. Just before Leyland is about to be drained, Van Helsing and Mei's brothers burst in, and Van Helsing destroys the last vampire. The survivors depart from the temple, save for Van Helsing, who feels a familiar presence and comes to face Dracula in Kah's body. Discovered, Dracula reveals his true form and attacks Van Helsing. In the ensuing struggle, Van Helsing succeeds in stabbing Dracula with a silver spear through the heart, causing the Count to turn to dust.

Cast

 Peter Cushing as Professor Van Helsing
 John Forbes-Robertson as Count Dracula
 David de Keyser as the voice of Count Dracula (uncredited)
 Robin Stewart as Leyland Van Helsing
 Julie Ege as Vanessa Buren
 Robert Hanna as British Consul
 David Chiang as Hsi Ching/Hsi Tien-en
 Shih Szu as Mai Kwei 
 Chan Shen as Kah the High Priest/Count Dracula's host
 Lau Kar-wing as Hsi Kwei (archer)
 Huang Pei-Chih as Hsi Po-Kwei (spearman)
 Wang Chiang as Hsi San (twin swordsman)
 Feng Ko-An as an assassin
 Hsu Hsia as an assassin

Production
The Legend of the Seven Golden Vampires began development due to Don Houghton's father-in-law knowing Hong Kong film producer Run Run Shaw. Houghton flew to Hong Kong to discuss a project with Run Run Shaw and his brother Runme Shaw who agreed to finance 50% of the film.

Filming
The Legend of the Seven Golden Vampires was filmed between October 22 and December 11, 1973, at Shaw Brothers Studio in Hong Kong, with mountain scenes shot on Kowloon Peak. The Shaw Brothers were not happy with how Roy Ward Baker was directing the film and had martial arts sequences choreographed by one of their studios directors, leading to a second unit set up that was handled by Chang Cheh. Chang Cheh added scenes that led to the Eastern version of the film to run at 110 minutes. Renee Glynee who was the continuity supervisor for the film stated that working with the Shaw Brothers Studios was "a big experience" due to language differences and that director Roy Ward Baker was screaming at the Chinese actors to stop spitting on set.

Release
The Legend of the Seven Golden Vampires was first released in Hong Kong on July 11, 1974. The film received its premiere in London on August 29, 1974, at the Warner Rendezvous Theatre and had general release in the United Kingdom on October 6, 1974, by Columbia/Warner Distributors. The American version cuts out 20 minutes of the film's footage and soundtrack and loops several remaining scenes to fill the running time.

For the film's release in the United States, it received a Sneak Peak screening in November 1975 at the Famous Monsters of Filmland Convention in New York City which included attendance by Michael Carreras and Peter Cushing. It received wider distribution in the United States in June 1979 by Dynamite Entertainment with a 75-minute running time and re-titled to The 7 Brothers Meet Dracula. 
Under the guidance of Michael Carreras, an original edit of the film eliminated Dracula, but Carreras stated that the film was too short so Dracula's character was re-instated. In the film Dracula has the ability to assume another person's appearance, an ability that was removed from Houghton's script for The Satanic Rites of Dracula, and re-used in this film.

The film was not a box office success. There was a planned sequel to be titled Kali, Devil Bride of Dracula, which was to be filmed in India, but it was never made.

Home media
The American DVD from Anchor Bay Entertainment features both the original unedited The Legend of the 7 Golden Vampires version and the later edited The 7 Brothers Meet Dracula version. The DVD also features a recording of Peter Cushing telling the story of the film with music and sound effects, which was released as an LP record at the time of the film's release.

In April 2019, Scream Factory released a Blu-ray featuring a new 2K scan of the film

Reception
In contemporary reviews, the London Times who found that the film "would be tedious if it were not for the distinguished presence of Peter Cushing as a Dracula-hunter and for some advanced exercises in the practice of vampire disintegration" Cinema TV Today found that "it is a pity that this blend of two popular genres could not have been more carefully thought out." Verina Glaessner wrote in the Monthly Film Bulletin found the film to be a "fascinating failure" noting that "part of the film's failure is due to an equivocal attitude towards its subject, and part of a misunderstanding of the role that hand-to-hand combat plays in Chinese films."

From retrospective reviews, Keith Phipps of The A.V. Club called the film "flawed" but "enjoyable," adding, "It's pretty much as ridiculous as it sounds, but there's something inherently entertaining about make-up-splattered vampires, distinguished British actors, and martial artists squaring off in periodic eruptions of kung-fu fighting." Phil Chandler of DVD Cult wrote, "Is it the best Hammer horror film ever made? Hell no. Is it the best Hammer film of the seventies? Hell yeah."
Graeme Clark of The Spinning Image said, "Cushing, in his last Hammer Dracula film, is as commanding as ever, but he and his Western companions are pretty disposable to the plot until the end, where the professor is left alone with the Count, who is hardly needed. Nevertheless, this last Hammer vampire outing has a real energy, in spite of being a mishmash, and is different enough to get by on sheer novelty alone." Writing in The Zombie Movie Encyclopedia, academic Peter Dendle called the raising of the undead army "one of the most visually spectacular in zombie cinema".  Glenn Kay, who wrote Zombie Movies: The Ultimate Guide, called the film "boisterous, action-packed, and very likeable".

Roy Ward Baker later spoke about the film, declaring that "the whole set-up was slip-shod, and nobody knew what anyone was doing." and that the film was "a failure, an absolute failure."  Michael Carreras later said this "wasn't such a good idea" although he felt "some of the film is quite good."

In other media 
The Legend of the 7 Golden Vampires was adapted into a 15-page comics story by Steve Moore and Brian Lewis, and published in The House of Hammer #4 (February 1977) by General Books Distribution. The same story was later reprinted in issue #24 (1982) of the same publication.

See also
 Vampire films

References

External links

 
 
 
The Legend of the 7 Golden Vampires at BFI Screenonline

1974 films
1974 horror films
Hong Kong horror films
British horror films
British martial arts films
Columbia Pictures films
1974 multilingual films
English-language Hong Kong films
Dracula films
Hammer Film Productions horror films
Films directed by Roy Ward Baker
Films scored by James Bernard
Films set in China
Films set in 1804
Films set in 1904
Shaw Brothers Studio films
Hong Kong supernatural horror films
British multilingual films
Hong Kong multilingual films
British supernatural horror films
1974 martial arts films
Dracula (Hammer film series)
Warner Bros. films
Films set in castles
Films set in Chongqing
Films set in Transylvania
1970s English-language films
1970s British films
1970s Hong Kong films